Mewa Singh Gill is an Indian politician. He was elected to the Lok Sabha, lower house of the Parliament of India as a member of the  Shiromani Akali Dal.

References

India MPs 1984–1989
Lok Sabha members from Punjab, India
Shiromani Akali Dal politicians
Year of birth missing (living people)
Living people
Place of birth missing (living people)